Jonathan "Joe" Simon Bramley-Fenton is an English artist, designer, sculptor and illustrator, who works in monochrome using graphite, ink and acrylics on paper. He has worked on a number of feature films as a concept designer and sculptor, including The Brothers Grimm directed by Terry Gilliam and The Hitchhiker's Guide to the Galaxy directed by Garth Jennings.

Career
Fenton has illustrated two children's picture books: What's Under the Bed? (published in 2008) and Boo! (published in 2010) by Simon & Schuster.

In 2014, he was commissioned to create a one-of-a-kind guitar for PRS Guitars signature artist (and lead guitarist of rock bands Creed and Alter Bridge) Mark Tremonti.

Fenton also produces and directs short films showing his art process, such as The Lullaby (2011) and Flight (2014).

Background

Fenton has a Bachelor of Arts (Hons) in Sculpture from the Wimbledon College of Art.

References

External links

1971 births
Living people
Artists from London
Alumni of the University of the Arts London